Walter Whipple (born 1943) is a Teaching Professor Emeritus of Polish in the Department of Germanic and Slavic Languages of Brigham Young University (BYU) in Provo, Utah. From 1990 to 1993, Whipple served as the president of the Poland Warsaw Mission of the Church of Jesus Christ of Latter-day Saints (LDS Church).

Whipple is the author of numerous English translations of Polish poems, including works of Wisława Szymborska, Juliusz Słowacki, Cyprian Kamil Norwid, Bolesław Prus, Jan Brzechwa, Julian Tuwim, and Kazimierz Tetmajer.

As a young man, Whipple served as a Mormon missionary in Switzerland. He earned bachelor's and master's degrees from BYU and his DMA from the University of Southern California. From 1974 to 1990, he was a professor of music at Rockford College.

Whipple is a professional organist and amateur cellist. He has served as a member of the General Church Music Committee of the LDS Church.

See also
 Polish literature
Walter Whipple served as organist at the Brigham Young University Jerusalem Center for Near Eastern Studies from May 2009 through August 2010.

Notes

References
Church News February 3, 1990;June 24, 1995

External links
 Official website of Brigham Young University
 Department of Germanic and Slavic Languages of BYU
 Polish Literature in English Translation

Translations available on-line

 Juliusz Słowacki (1809–1849)
 The Funeral of Captain Meyzner
 My Testament
  On Transporting Napolean’s Ashes
 Reassurance
 Separation
 Sowinski in the Trenches of Wola
 Cyprian Kamil Norwid (1821–1883)
 The Larva
 Mother Tongue (Język ojczysty)
 My Song
 To Citizen John Brown (Do obywatela Johna Brown)
 What Did You Do to Athens, Socrates? (Coś ty Atenom zrobił Sokratesie...)
 Bolesław Prus (1847–1912) 
 Le Tombeau de Krasicki
 The Silver Locust
 Some of the Picture
 Kazimierz Tetmajer (1865–1940)
 A Cradle Wind
 Julian Tuwim (1894–1953)
 The Locomotive (Lokomotywa)
 Konstanty Ildefons Gałczyński (1905–1953)
 A Song of the Soldiers of Westerplatte (Pieśń o żołnierzach z Westerplatte)
 Wisława Szymborska (1923–2012)
 A Cat in an Empty Apartment (Kot w pustym mieszkaniu)
 Children of an Epoch
 Circus Animals
 Consciousness
 The End and the Beginning
 From Korea (Z Korei)
 Hatred (Nienawiść)
 It’s Most Fortunate (Wielkie to szczęście)
 The Laboratory
 Love at First Sight (Miłość od pierwszego wejrzenia)
 May 16, 1973
 Nothing’s a Gift
 The Seance
 The Silent Movies
 The Sky
 Some People Like Poetry (Niektórzy lubią poezję)

American leaders of the Church of Jesus Christ of Latter-day Saints
Brigham Young University alumni
Brigham Young University faculty
Living people
Mission presidents (LDS Church)
American Mormon missionaries in Poland
American Mormon missionaries in Switzerland
Polish–English translators
Translators from Polish
Rockford University faculty
USC Thornton School of Music alumni
20th-century Mormon missionaries
21st-century Mormon missionaries
1943 births
20th-century translators
21st-century translators
Latter Day Saints from Illinois
Latter Day Saints from California
Latter Day Saints from Utah
Missionary linguists